The 2017 Ole Miss Rebels Baseball team represented the University of Mississippi in the 2017 NCAA Division I baseball season. The Rebels played their home games in Swayze Field.

Previous season 
The Rebels finished the 2016 season 43–19 overall and 18–12 in the conference. The Rebels advanced to the semifinals of the SEC Tournament before suffering elimination at the hands of eventual champion Texas A&M in the semifinals. The Rebels earned regional hosting status in the 2016 NCAA Division I baseball tournament, but two straight losses to Utah and Tulane brought the season to an end.

2016 MLB Draft Selections 
The Rebels had six players selected in the 2016 MLB draft. The Rebels also had four signees drafted out of high school.

†Grae Kessinger, Cooper Johnson, Will Ethridge, and Ryan Rolison were drafted out of high school, but decided to attend Ole Miss.

Preseason

Preseason All-American teams 
3rd Team

 Colby Bortles - Third Baseman (Collegiate Baseball)

SEC Media poll 
In the 2017 SEC media poll, released February 10, 2017, the Rebels were predicted to finish third place in the Western Division.

Preseason All-SEC teams 

2nd Team

 Tate Blackman - Second Baseman
 Colby Bortles - Third Baseman

Roster

Schedule and results 

*Rankings are based on the team's current ranking in the Coaches Poll.

Awards and honors

Award watch lists

Regular season awards

All-SEC Awards

All-American Awards

2017 MLB Draft 

Players in bold will return to Ole Miss.

Record vs. conference opponents

Rankings

References 

Ole Miss Rebels
Ole Miss Rebels baseball seasons
2017 in sports in Mississippi